SS Pisa was a transatlantic passenger steamship built by Alexander Stephen and Sons in Glasgow. Pisa began her maiden voyage in 1897 and was at sea during the sinking of RMS Titanic after she hit an iceberg and sank on 15 April 1912.

History
SS Pisa was built as a transatlantic passenger liner by Alexander Stephen and Sons for the Sloman Line. She was the last ship built for the Sloman Line. She was launched on 2 November 1896, and departed on her maiden voyage from Hamburg to New York City on 20 May 1897.

In 1903, she was chartered by the Hamburg-America Line (HAPAG), a German owned shipping company, and began to make the routine Hamburg to New York crossings for the company on 11 April 1903. On 1 September 1907, she was bought by the Hamburg-America Line and resumed her Hamburg to New York trips. On 14 April 1911, the Pisa started her first Hamburg-Quebec-Montreal voyage.

On 1 April 1912, she departed Hamburg for Saint John, New Brunswick. She encountered ice on 14 April, and was in the same general vicinity as the RMS Titanic.  She arrived in Saint John on 17 April. Her last Hamburg-Quebec-Montreal trip was on 29 August 1913, and her last Hamburg-New York trip was on 11 April 1914.  The First World War would commence shortly thereafter on 28 July 1914 pitting her native Germany against the Allied powers.

On 22 June 1916, she sailed from Batum for Constantinople, Smyrna, Piraeus and New York to take refuge from US seizure until 17 April. After being seized by the United States Government, she was given the name USS Ascutney and continued in service until 1924, when she was scrapped in Baltimore, Maryland.

References

Further reading
St. John Ship Arrivals 1910-1914 (G. Dorscher). Published by the Odessa Digital Library - 17 Feb 2001

Ships of the Hamburg America Line
Steamships
Ships built on the River Clyde
1896 ships